At Expo 2010, which was celebrated in Shanghai from 1 May to 31 October 2010 were present 242 participants: 192 nations and 50 international organizations. This represents the largest participation at any expo.



Participants

Nations
192 nations registered for the Expo (three countries that had already confirmed its participation needed to withdraw because of internal problems: Burkina Faso, Bhutan and Kuwait). These are 186 independent countries, recognized by the UN (the home country, China, included); two non UN-recognized nations: Chinese Taipei and Palestine; two associated states of New Zealand: Cook Islands and Niue, and the two Chinese SARs: Hong Kong and Macau.

The next table shows, by confirmation date, the nations that have notified the Government of the People's Republic of China its participation at the Expo; the fourth column indicates if the state had constructed its own individual pavilion; the last column indicates the section which the pavilion was located within the Expo site.

Organizations
50 organizations in total participated at the Expo: 40 international organizations and 10 non-governmental organizations.

References

External links 
 Official web site
 Information at the BIE web site

Expo 2010